Below is the list of populated places in Karabük Province, Turkey by the districts. In the following lists first place in each list is the administrative center of the district.

Karabük 
	Karabük
	Acıöz, Karabük
	Akören, Karabük
	Arıcak, Karabük
	Aşağı Kızılcaören, Karabük
	Başköy, Karabük
	Bolkuş, Karabük
	Bulak, Karabük
	Burunsuz, Karabük
	Bürnük, Karabük
	Cemaller, Karabük
	Cumayanı, Karabük
	Çukurca, Karabük
	Davutlar, Karabük
	Demirciler, Karabük
	Düzçam, Karabük
	Gölören, Karabük
	Güneşli, Karabük
	Kadı, Karabük
	Kahyalar, Karabük
	Kamış, Karabük
	Kapaklı, Karabük
	Karaağaç, Karabük
	Karaşar, Karabük
	Kayı, Karabük
	Kılavuzlar, Karabük
	Mehterler, Karabük
	Ortaca, Karabük
	Ödemiş, Karabük
	Saitler, Karabük
	Salmanlar, Karabük
	Sipahiler, Karabük
	Şenler, Karabük
	Tandır, Karabük
	Üçbaş, Karabük
	Yeşilköy, Karabük
	Yeşiltepe, Karabük
	Yukarı Kızılcaören, Karabük
	Zopran, Karabük

Eflani
	Eflani
	Abakolu, Eflani
	Acıağaç, Eflani
	Aday, Eflani
	Afşar, Eflani
	Akçakese, Eflani
	Akören, Eflani
	Alaçat, Eflani
	Alpagut, Eflani
	Bağlıca, Eflani
	Bakırcılar, Eflani
	Başiğdir, Eflani
	Bedil, Eflani
	Bostancı, Eflani
	Bostancılar, Eflani
	Çal, Eflani
	Çamyurt, Eflani
	Çavuşlu, Eflani
	Çemçi, Eflani
	Çengeller, Eflani
	Çörekli, Eflani
	Çukurgelik, Eflani
	Çukurören, Eflani
	Demirli, Eflani
	Emirler, Eflani
	Esencik, Eflani
	Gelicek, Eflani
	Gökgöz, Eflani
	Göller, Eflani
	Güngören, Eflani
	Günlüce, Eflani
	Hacışaban, Eflani
	Halkevli, Eflani
	Karacapınar, Eflani
	Karataş, Eflani
	Karlı, Eflani
	Kavak, Eflani
	Kıran, Eflani
	Kocacık, Eflani
	Koltucak, Eflani
	Kutluören, Eflani
	Müftüler, Eflani
	Mülayim, Eflani
	Osmanlar, Eflani
	Ovaçalış, Eflani
	Ovaşeyhler, Eflani
	Paşabey, Eflani
	Pınarözü, Eflani
	Saçak, Eflani
	Saraycık, Eflani
	Seferler, Eflani
	Soğucak, Eflani
	Şenyurt, Eflani
	Ulugeçit, Eflani
	Yağlıca, Eflani

Eskipazar
	Eskipazar
	Adiller, Eskipazar
	Arslanlar, Eskipazar
	Babalar, Eskipazar
	Başpınar, Eskipazar
	Bayındır, Eskipazar
	Belen, Eskipazar
	Beytarla, Eskipazar
	Boncuklar, Eskipazar
	Bölükören, Eskipazar
	Budaklar, Eskipazar
	Bulduk, Eskipazar
	Büyükyayalar, Eskipazar
	Çandırlar, Eskipazar
	Çaylı, Eskipazar
	Deresemail, Eskipazar
	Deresoblan, Eskipazar
	Doğancılar, Eskipazar
	Doğlacık, Eskipazar
	Gömlekçiler, Eskipazar
	Gözlü, Eskipazar
	Hamamlı, Eskipazar
	Hamzalar, Eskipazar
	Hanköy, Eskipazar
	Hasanlar, Eskipazar
	Haslı, Eskipazar
	İmanlar, Eskipazar
	İnceboğaz, Eskipazar
	Kabaarmut, Eskipazar
	Kapaklı, Eskipazar
	Kapucular, Eskipazar
	Karahasanlar, Eskipazar
	Karaören, Eskipazar
	Köyceğiz, Eskipazar
	Kulat, Eskipazar
	Kuzören, Eskipazar
	Ortaköy, Eskipazar
	Ova, Eskipazar
	Ozanköy, Eskipazar
	Sadeyaka, Eskipazar
	Sallar, Eskipazar
	Sofular, Eskipazar
	Söbüçimen, Eskipazar
	Şevkiler, Eskipazar
	Tamuşlar, Eskipazar
	Topçalı, Eskipazar
	Yazıboy, Eskipazar
	Yazıkavak, Eskipazar
	Yeşiller, Eskipazar
	Yürecik, Eskipazar

Ovacık
	Ovacık
	Abdullar, Ovacık
	Ahmetler, Ovacık
	Alınca, Ovacık
	Ambarözü, Ovacık
	Avlağıkaya, Ovacık
	Başboyunduruk, Ovacık
	Belen, Ovacık
	Beydili, Ovacık
	Beydini, Ovacık
	Boduroğlu, Ovacık
	Boyalı, Ovacık
	Bölükören, Ovacık
	Çatak, Ovacık
	Çukur, Ovacık
	Doğanlar, Ovacık
	Dökecek, Ovacık
	Dudaş, Ovacık
	Ekincik, Ovacık
	Erkeç, Ovacık
	Ganibeyler, Ovacık
	Gökçedüz, Ovacık
	Gümelik, Ovacık
	Güneysaz, Ovacık
	Hatipoğlu, Ovacık
	İmanlar, Ovacık
	Kavaklar, Ovacık
	Kışla, Ovacık
	Koltuk, Ovacık
	Küçüksu, Ovacık
	Pelitçik, Ovacık
	Pürçükören, Ovacık
	Sarılar, Ovacık
	Sofuoğlu, Ovacık
	Soğanlı, Ovacık
	Sülük, Ovacık
	Şamlar, Ovacık
	Taşoğlu, Ovacık
	Yaka, Ovacık
	Yaylacılar, Ovacık
	Yeniören, Ovacık
	Yığınot, Ovacık
	Yürekören, Ovacık

Safranbolu
	Safranbolu
	Ağaçkese, Safranbolu
	Akören, Safranbolu
	Alören, Safranbolu
	Aşağıçiftlik, Safranbolu
	Aşağıdana, Safranbolu
	Aşağıgüney, Safranbolu
	Bağcığaz, Safranbolu
	Bostanbükü, Safranbolu
	Cücahlı, Safranbolu
	Çatak, Safranbolu
	Çavuşlar, Safranbolu
	Çerçen, Safranbolu
	Çıraklar, Safranbolu
	Davutobası, Safranbolu
	Değirmencik, Safranbolu
	Dere, Safranbolu
	Düzce, Safranbolu
	Geren, Safranbolu
	Gökpınar, Safranbolu
	Gündoğan, Safranbolu
	Hacılarobası, Safranbolu
	Harmancık, Safranbolu
	İnceçay, Safranbolu
	İncekaya, Safranbolu
	Kadıbükü, Safranbolu
	Karacatepe, Safranbolu
	Karapınar, Safranbolu
	Karıt, Safranbolu
	Kehler, Safranbolu
	Kırıklar, Safranbolu
	Konarı, Safranbolu
	Kuzyakahacılar, Safranbolu
	Kuzyakaköseler, Safranbolu
	Kuzyakaöte, Safranbolu
	Navsaklar, Safranbolu
	Nebioğlu, Safranbolu
	Oğulören, Safranbolu
	Ovacuma, Safranbolu
	Örencik, Safranbolu
	Pelitören, Safranbolu
	Sakaralan, Safranbolu
	Sarıahmetli, Safranbolu
	Sat, Safranbolu
	Sırçalı, Safranbolu
	Sine, Safranbolu
	Tayyip, Safranbolu
	Tokatlı, Safranbolu
	Toprakcuma, Safranbolu
	Üçbölük, Safranbolu
	Yazıköy, Safranbolu
	Yolbaşı, Safranbolu
	Yörük, Safranbolu
	Yukarıçiftlik, Safranbolu
	Yukarıdana, Safranbolu

Yenice
	Yenice
	Abdullahoğlu, Yenice
	Akmanlar, Yenice
	Bağbaşı, Yenice
	Cihanbey, Yenice
	Çakıllar, Yenice
	Çamlı, Yenice
	Çeltik, Yenice
	Değirmenyanı, Yenice
	Derebaşı, Yenice
	Esenköy, Yenice
	Gökbel, Yenice
	Güney, Yenice
	Hisar, Yenice
	Hüseyinbeyoğlu, Yenice
	Ibrıcak, Yenice
	Kadıköy, Yenice
	Kale, Yenice
	Karahasanlar, Yenice
	Kayaarkası, Yenice
	Kayadibi, Yenice
	Keyfallar, Yenice
	Kuzdağ, Yenice
	Nodullar, Yenice
	Ören, Yenice
	Saray, Yenice
	Satuk, Yenice
	Şenköy, Yenice
	Şirinköy, Yenice
	Tir, Yenice
	Yamaçköy, Yenice
	Yazıköy, Yenice
	Yeniköy, Yenice
	Yeşilköy, Yenice
	Yirmibeşoğlu, Yenice
	Yortan, Yenice

References

List
Karabuk